Cornularia is a genus of fungi in the family Dermateaceae.

References

External links 
 Cornularia at catalogueoflife.org
 Cornularia at MycoBank

Dermateaceae genera